California's 30th State Senate district is one of 40 California State Senate districts. The seat is currently represented by Bob Archuleta.

District profile 
The district encompasses most of Downtown and South Los Angeles, as well as neighboring portions of Inglewood and the Westside.

Los Angeles County – 9.4% Culver City
 Inglewood – 12.7% Ladera Heights
 Los Angeles – 21.6% Crenshaw
 Downtown – partial''
 Florence

Election results from statewide races

List of senators 
Due to redistricting, the 30th district has been moved around different parts of the state. The current iteration resulted from the 2011 redistricting by the California Citizens Redistricting Commission.

Election results 1994 - present

2021 Special Election 
California Gov. Gavin Newsom announced that a special election will take place on March 2, 2021. As of March 13th, 2021, election results have certified candidate Sydney Kamlager won the election and will represent California's 30th Senate district. Her term ends on November 8, 2022.

2018

2014

2010

2006

2002

1998

1994

See also 
 California State Senate
 California State Senate districts
 Districts in California

References

External links 
 District map from the California Citizens Redistricting Commission

30
Government of Los Angeles County, California
Government of Los Angeles
Downtown Los Angeles
South Los Angeles
Baldwin Hills, Los Angeles
Baldwin Hills (mountain range)
Century City, Los Angeles
Crenshaw, Los Angeles
Culver City, California
Exposition Park (Los Angeles neighborhood)
Jefferson Park, Los Angeles
Mid-City, Los Angeles
West Adams, Los Angeles
Westside (Los Angeles County)